The 2019 season is Rosenborg's 40th consecutive year in the top flight now known as Eliteserien, their 52st season in the top flight of Norwegian football. They will participate in Eliteserien, the Cup, the 2019 Mesterfinalen and the 2019-20 UEFA Champions League, entering at the First qualifying round stage. This will be Eirik Horneland's first season as Rosenborg manager after being appointed on January 3.

Squad

Transfers

Winter

In:

Out:

Summer

In:

Out:

Friendlies

The Atlantic Cup

Competitions

Eliteserien

Results summary

Results by round

Results

Table

Norwegian Cup

Mesterfinalen

Champions League

Qualifying phase

UEFA Europa League

Group stage

Squad statistics

Appearances and goals

|-
|colspan="14"|Players away from Rosenborg on loan:
|-

|-
|colspan="14"|Players who appeared for Rosenborg no longer at the club:

|-
|}

Disciplinary record

See also
Rosenborg BK seasons

References 

2019
Rosenborg
Rosenborg
Rosenborg